Fulton Township is one of the twelve townships of Fulton County, Ohio, United States. As of the 2010 census the population was 3,182, of whom 1,519 lived in the unincorporated portions of the township.

Geography
Located in the eastern part of the county, it borders the following townships:
Amboy Township - north
Richfield Township, Lucas County - northeast corner
Spencer Township, Lucas County - east, north of Harding Township
Harding Township, Lucas County - east, south of Spencer Township
Swanton Township, Lucas County - southeast
Swan Creek Township - south
York Township - southwest corner
Pike Township - west
Royalton Township - northwest corner

Part of the village of Swanton is located in southeastern Fulton Township.

Name and history
It is the only Fulton Township statewide.

Government
The township is governed by a three-member board of trustees, who are elected in November of odd-numbered years to a four-year term beginning on the following January 1. Two are elected in the year after the presidential election and one is elected in the year before it. There is also an elected township fiscal officer, who serves a four-year term beginning on April 1 of the year after the election, which is held in November of the year before the presidential election. Vacancies in the fiscal officership or on the board of trustees are filled by the remaining trustees.

References

External links
County website

Townships in Fulton County, Ohio
Townships in Ohio